The 2018–19 Eastern Kentucky Colonels men's basketball team represented Eastern Kentucky University during the 2018–19 NCAA Division I men's basketball season. The Colonels, led by first-year head coach A. W. Hamilton, played their home games at McBrayer Arena within Alumni Coliseum as members of the Ohio Valley Conference. They finished the season 13–18 overall, 6–12 in OVC play, finishing in a four-way tie for sixth place. Tiebreakers worked against them, so they failed to qualify to play in the OVC tournament for the fourth consecutive season.

Previous season
The Colonels finished the season 11–20, 5–13 in OVC play to finish in a three-way tie for ninth place. They failed to make the OVC tournament for the third consecutive season.

On February 26, 2018, the school fired Dan McHale as head coach after three seasons. He finished at EKU with a three-year record of 38–55. On March 23, NC State assistant A.W. Hamilton was hired as the new head coach of the Colonels.

Roster

Schedule and results

|-
!colspan=9 style=| Exhibition

|-
!colspan=9 style=| Non-conference regular season

|-
!colspan=9 style=| Ohio Valley Conference regular season

Source

References

Eastern Kentucky Colonels men's basketball seasons
Eastern Kentucky
Eastern Kentucky
Eastern Kentucky